The Cairo Metro (lit. "Cairo Tunnel Metro" or   ) is the rapid transit system in Greater Cairo, Egypt. It was the first of the three full-fledged metro systems in Africa and the first in the Middle East to be constructed. As of 2013, the metro carried nearly 4 million passengers per day. The system consists of three operational lines numbered 1 to 3.

The Cairo Metro is run by the National Authority for Tunnels. The lines use standard gauge.

Operations

The middle two cars (4th and 5th) of each train have been reserved for women since 1989 (the 5th car becomes mixed-use after 21:00). There are blue signs at every station that signify the position of these cars. These cars are used as an option for women who do not wish to ride with men in the same car; however, women can still ride other cars freely. This policy was introduced to the protection of women from sexual harassment by men.

Cairo Metro operates from 05:00 to 01:00 (except during Ramadan, when it operates from 05:00 to 02:00), with the remaining hours reserved for maintenance work.

The ticket price was £E1 for each journey, regardless of distance. The Ministry of Transportation agreed to double the ticket prices, starting from Friday 24 March 2017, costing £E2 for the normal ticket, £E1.5 for the ticket of the minor, £E1 for the special needs ticket after formerly costing £E1, £E0.75 and £E0.5, respectively. Again on 10 May 2018, the ministry of transportation agreed to raise the ticket prices to be £E3 for 9 stops, £E5 for 16 stops and £E7 for more than 16 stops. As of July 2020, 9 stops cost £E5, 16 stops cost £E7, and rides exceeding 16 stops cost £E10.

Network

Line 1

Line 1 (blue) is the oldest line of the Cairo Metro, with its first  segment having opened in 1987. The line can carry 60,000 passengers per hour in each direction.

Line 1 has a train driving simulator supplied by Transurb Technirail that won the international tender issued by Cairo Metro in 2011.

Line 2

Line 2 (red) is the second line of the Cairo Metro, first opening in 1996. It serves 20 stations, of which 12 are underground. It is mostly in the bored tunnel, with two exceptions: a short section at the northern end approaching Shubra El Kheima which is elevated, and a section just south of this by cut-and-cover. Line 2 uses the third rail electrification system instead of the overhead line used in the first line. The communication extension for line 2 was provided by Alcatel in 2005.

The minimum headway for the line is 2 minutes 40 seconds to 3 minutes.

Line 2 has a simulator installed in Shubra since 2002 which was delivered by French company CORYS.

The first tunnel to be built under the Nile River carries line 2 across the river.

Line 3

Line 3 (green) is currently the newest, opening in 2012. It presently operates from El Kit Kat to Adly Mansour, with construction underway for the remaining line to the northwest of Greater Cairo. Eventually, it will link Cairo International Airport to Cairo University and Imbaba. The line will cross under the two branches of the River Nile, as does Line 2.

Phase 4-1 from Al Ahram to El Shams Club opened on June 15, 2019 (except for Heliopolis Square station).

History

Background

As the biggest and most densely populated city in Africa, and the Arab World, the case for a metro in Greater Cairo was strong. In 1987 that population stood at 10 million residents, not counting the two million or so commuters who came into Cairo every day to work. The capacity of Cairo's public transport infrastructure was around 20,000 passengers/hour, which increased to 60,000 after the construction of the metro.

Proposed plans
The idea of a metro was first proposed in the 1930s by engineer Saiyed Abdel Wahed of the Egyptian Railway Authority, however, the idea did not progress. Following the Egyptian Revolution of 1952, there was renewed interest in the idea. In 1954 French experts made a report about the future of the transportation in Egypt. They also proposed that there should be one company in charge of all transportation systems.

Later on, multiple experts came to Egypt regarding that project: Soviet experts in 1956, Japanese experts in 1960 and French experts in 1962, which concluded the following:
The creation of a metro system with multiple lines. The first is a  line connecting Helwan with El-Marg going under Kasr el Eini street and Ramses Street.

In 1964 British experts advised the creation of a metro line from Bab El Louk to Shubra. Lastly, in 1969, the government approved the need for a study showing the needed capacity for Cairo's transportation system. The Egyptian Ministry of Transport issued an international tender for the creation of the study. Eight companies applied and the French company SOFRETU won the tender on 20 September 1970. The study was finished in 1973 and included mainly the study of the population development in Cairo and its needs for transportation capacity in 1980, 1985 and 1990. It concluded the necessity for three lines in greater Cairo to solve the transportation problem.
The first line would use the already available railways (Helwan-Bab El luk and Al Laymoun Bridge-El Marg) and connect them through a metro. The second line would be  and connect Shubra El-Kheima and Bulaq going through Ramses Street and Tahrir Square.

The priority for the project was the first line which would reduce 30% of the daily transport to and from Cairo and would incorporate pre-existing rail infrastructure. The detailed study of the construction took 6 years from 1975 to 1981. A tender was made for the construction of the metro and the Egyptian-French company Entra Nevra Arabco won it and had the task of constructing the metro system.

Construction works
The construction of Line 1 started in 1982 after the French government agreed on giving Egypt the necessary loan. The first section was opened on 27 September 1987 and the line was completed in 1989 connecting Helwan with El Marg and consisting of 33 stations with a total length of 43 km of which 4.7 km underground. In 1999, New El Marg station was added to the northern end of the line, bringing its total length to 44.3 km. Helwan University station was built between Wadi Houf and Ain Helwan stations.

Cairo's metro network was greatly expanded in the mid-1990s with the building of Line 2, from Shoubra El Kheima to Cairo University, with an extension to Giza. The line includes the first tunnel under the Nile. The construction of the line was finished in October 2000, and it was later extended to El Mounib.

Proposed lines

Line 4 (October-Oasis Highway - the Police Academy)

Line 4 is planned to run from Haram District to the New Cairo district, connecting Greater Cairo from West to East. As of early 2019, construction was scheduled to begin in Q3 2019, with an estimated completion date of 2024.

Phase 1 (west) of the project will run from El-Malek El-Saleh Station (Interchange with Line 1) to the October-Oasis Highway Station with a total length of 18 km, passing through Giza Railway Station (Interchange with Line 2); the original plan for phase 1 was for it to start from El-Malek El-Saleh Station and end at the Grand Egyptian Museum Station with a total length of 10 km, but the Ministry of Roads & Transportation decided to extend the Line in their efforts to further connect the Governorate of 6 October to the Greater Cairo Area; Phase 1 also includes the plan to connect the end of Line 4 to the suburbs of 6 October mainly through executing The October 6th Tram system (The O6T) which will be by using a tram-train system supplied with the Alstom Regio-Citadis trams. This phase will have 15 stations to be constructed with a duration of 6.5 years. Phase 1 stations will be equipped with an automatic fare collection system and platform screen doors, and will include elevators for the use of disabled passengers.
Phase 1 bidding was postponed until May 2015 to enable Japan International Cooperation Agency (JICA) to complete the feasibility study and to resolve other problems with the construction starting by 2015 or 2016 according to Ismail El-Nagdy, Chairman of the National Authority for Tunnels with Japan International Cooperation Agency financing $1.2 billion loan while Egyptian government covering the rest of $2.4 billion.

Phase 2 will begin from El-Malek El-Saleh Station, passing east through Magra El-Oyoun street and Salah El-Din Citadel in Salah Salem street and ending at the 6th District Station (beginning of Nasr City district) with a completion date set at October 2018.

Phase 3 will begin from 6th District Station and end at Makram Ebeid Station, following Mustafa El-Nahas street in bored tunnels under the existing old tram system, and ultimately deconstructing the old railway and paving its right-of-way (increasing the street by two lanes in each direction, which is critically needed to lighten the traffic congestion in the area). This phase has a completion date set for October 2019. Mitsubishi was the only company to submit an offer on a tender for 64 trains in the third and fourth phases of the project. The offer was accepted in October 2018.

Phase 4, the final phase, will begin from Makram Ebeid Station with bored tunnels following Doctor Hassan El-Sherif street and Ahmed El-Zomor street, ending at Police Academy Station near the Ring Road.

The New Cairo Monorail

This project was first proposed by private investors as a plan to connect Line 3 with Line 4, through a route that is mostly parallel to the Ring Road's eastern arc, therefore covering New Cairo from north to south starting at the Cairo International Airport and ending at the beginning of the Cairo-Ain Sokhna Highway.

In August 2016 a different monorail project was under discussion, connecting 6 October city with other western parts of Greater Cairo.

A contract was signed in August 2019 with Bombardier Transportation, Orascom Construction, and Arab Contractors for $4.5 billion to build and operate the two monorail lines. The first will run 54 km from eastern Cairo to the new administrative capital. The second will run 42 km from 6 October City to Giza.

Qalyub Line 2 extension
As of December 2017, Spokesperson for the Egyptian National Authority for Tunnels (NAT) said that there are plans to extend Line 2 7 kilometers to the north from Shubra Al-Kheima station to end at Qalyub station due to the increasing traffic in north Cairo entrances, He also said that bidding will be held in February 2018 and the winner will be revealed mid-2018. The station will be an at-grade station built parallel to the train railway, bridges will be built to divert traffic from the Metro route.

Long-term plans

A transportation study of the Greater Cairo region was completed in 1999. It recommended the implementation of a six-line system consisting of lines 1, 2 and 3 (existing), and lines 4, 5 and 6. The completed Metro Network would be capable of serving most of the densely populated areas in the Greater Cairo region, which was much in need of a comprehensive mass transit system. The plans include interchange stations between the six metro lines and would also provides interchange facilities with existing main railway stations, the airport, and bus stations.

The six planned metro lines aim to meet the transportation demands of the Greater Cairo area up to the year 2032. However, the actual construction and implementation schedule will be restricted by available funding, and the timetable will likely slip.

Line 5 would be a half-circular line connecting lines 1-4 in northern Cairo, running from Nasr City in the east to Port Said Street and Shubra El Kheima in the west. It would intersect Line 1 at Helmiet el-Zaitoun station, Line 2 at El-Khalafawy station, Line 3 at Haroun station, and Line 4 at Al-Wafaa we al-Amal station.

Line 6 would be a north-south line, from Shubra in the north to the Maadi and Helwan districts in the south. It would run from Ataba Station through El Kalaa street in bored tunnels to Salah Eldin Citadel Station (Interchange with Line 4) and move on from there to both districts via bored tunnels using the existing route El-Mahager Railway as a guide through both Maadi and Helwan. It would intersect Line 1 at Ghamra station, Line 3 at Bab al-Sharia station, Line 4 at Amr Ibn al-Ase station, and Line 5 at Sawah station.

Network map

See also

 List of Cairo Metro stations
 List of metro systems
 Cairo Light Rail Transit
 Cairo Monorail

Notes

References

Other references

Further reading

External links

Cairo Metro – official website 

 
+
Giza
Rapid transit in Egypt
Underground rapid transit in Egypt
Electric railways in Egypt
Rail transport in Egypt
Railway lines opened in 1987
Downtown Cairo
750 V DC railway electrification